Mehdi Mahdavikia (born 24 July 1977) is an Iranian professional football coach and former player usually played as a right winger or right back.

He is currently under contract by Hamburger SV as a youth coach, and also manages his own youth academy, FC KIA.

Mahdavikia currently represents Asian Football Confederation (AFC) in the Football Advisory Panel of International Football Association Board (IFAB), joining the body in 2019. On 15 May 2013, Mahdavikia was appointed as AFC Grassroots Ambassador.

During his playing career, Mahdavikia internationally represented Iranian national team, which he captained from 2006 to 2009, and currently is the fourth most capped player of all-time. He played for Iranian clubs Bank Melli, Persepolis, Steel Azin and Damash Gilan, as well as German clubs VfL Bochum, Hamburger SV and Eintracht Frankfurt, spending 12 consecutive seasons in Bundesliga.

He won the Asian Young Footballer of the Year award in 1997 as well as the Asian Footballer of the Year award in 2003. He was known for his crossing, speed and dribbling.

Club career

Early career
Mahdavikia first played for Persepolis in his native Iran before moving to VfL Bochum in Germany. After Bochum's relegation, he signed for Bundesliga side Hamburg where he stayed for the next eight seasons.

Hamburger SV
Hamburger Morgenpost estimated market value of Mahdavikia in 1999 as DM6.5 million.

His initial position for HSV was right fullback, from which he was known for his attacking runs, as he has previous experience as a right winger and at times has played as a striker. He also played some matches for Pas in Asian games as help for the club. Under coach Frank Pagelsdorf Mahdavikia used to play wide striker. For the 2006–07 Bundesliga season he moved back to his natural position of right wing, in support of Central Midfielder Rafael van der Vaart. He was awarded Hamburg Player of the Year in 2003 and 2004 by the fans, and also attained the title of the top assister of goals in the Bundesliga.

In 2003, Die Welt wrote that Mahdavikia is worth €8–10 million.

However, compared to his previous season, he had a poor season in 2004–05 and was benched. In the 2005–06 season he gained his old form back and was able to regain his spot as a starter, being influential in many of Hamburg's victories, such as scoring the winning goal against then Bundesliga heavyweights Schalke.

Mahdavikia's strongest points were his vision, passing skills, fast-paced runs (his nickname in Iran is "The Rocket"), and set-pieces such as corners, spotkicks and free kicks. He usually was the right-footed alternative to Van der Vaart's well known left foot. Apart from being a total professional on the pitch, he is also known as a perfect gentleman off the pitch, always finding the time for fans and reporters to answer questions or sign autographs.

His nickname in Hamburg is The Carpet (der Teppich) for his ability to "magically glide past" his opponents like the enchanted carpet.

Eintracht Frankfurt
On 8 June 2007, Mahdavikia signed a three-year contract with Eintracht Frankfurt.

In his first season, he had two bad injuries that forced him to miss many matches. In the second season he was mostly benched and not used in many matches which showed that the club did not want him anymore. After 255 Games (26 goals, 55 assists) in the Bundesliga for HSV, Bochum and Eintracht Frankfurt, left Germany to sign for Steel Azin in January 2010.

Return to Iran

On 4 July 2011, Mahdavikia signed a contract with Amir Abedini, President of the Damash Gilan to join to the club for one year but he was joined to his beloved club, Persepolis in mid-season to play for club in his last year of playing football. He extended his contract with Persepolis for another season on 19 June 2012.

Retirement

On 2 March 2013, Mahdavikia announced that he would retire at the end of the 2012–13 season. Persepolis also announced that Mahdavikia's farewell match would be in a pre-season friendly match against A.C. Milan in June 2013, played in the Azadi Stadium, but it was later announced that Mahdavikia's last match would be against his former side, Hamburger SV in June 2013 in the same stadium.

Mahdavikia confirmed on 14 March 2013 that he ended his active football career. He played his last match as a football player in the 2013 Hazfi Cup Final, coming on extra time as a substitute. On 28 November 2013, he played a farewell match at Azadi Stadium between Persepolis XI and A.C. Milan XI. Participants in the match included former teams' legends like Hamid Derakhshan, Mohammad Panjali, Farshad Pious, Karim Bagheri, Hamid Estili, Nasser Mohammadkhani, Pejman Jamshidi, Edmond Bezik which played for Persepolis and Franco Baresi, Paolo Maldini, Daniele Massaro, Gennaro Gattuso and Alberigo Evani for A.C. Milan. Persepolis were managed by the club's most successful manager Ali Parvin. When Mahdavikia came on as a substitute in the 32nd minute, Pious gave his shirt to Mahdavikia, in a remarkable replay after seventeen years that Pious did so in Mahdavikia's first match for Persepolis. The match was won by A.C. Milan XI 3–1 with Mahdavikia assisting the only goal.

International career

Having been awarded the Asian Young Footballer of the Year award in 1997, Mahdavikia was considered Iran's best player in the 1998 FIFA World Cup and was named in the list from which the team of the tournament was chosen. In 2003, he was awarded Asian Player of the Year by the Asian Football Confederation. He was also the top assister in the 2004 Asian Cup, exhibiting stunning form to steer Iran's attack to superb attacking football. He played in four Asian Cups (1996, 2000, 2004, 2007) and two World Cups (1998, 2006).

Mahdavikia was one of the influential players that played in Iran's crucial 1–0 victory over Bahrain to qualify for the 2006 FIFA World Cup held in Germany. Following the FIFA World Cup in Germany, 2006, Mahdavikia was expected to assume the role of Captain in the Iranian national side, replacing Ali Daei and Yahya Golmohammadi who had publicly announced their intention to retire after the tournament. Mahdavikia was given the captain's band on 16 August 2006 in an Asian Cup qualifier versus Syria.

Mahdavikia has reportedly been forced to "retire" from international football after wearing a green bracelet in the final World Cup 2010 qualification match against the Republic of Korea. The green bracelet was a sign of support for those protesting the highly contested Iranian presidential election.
He was forced to retire from Team Melli after 13 years and playing in two World Cups (1998, 2006), four Asian Cups (1996, 2000, 2004, 2007), one Asian Games tournament (1998), four World Cup qualifying campaigns (1998, 2002, 2006, 2010), three Asian Cup qualifying campaigns (2000, 2004, 2007) and one AFC/OFC Cup.

Managerial career
Mahdavikia was the manager of the Iranian youth teams. In 2015, he founded the KIA Football Academy with Ali Doustimehr. He currently has a role as a youth coach with Hamburger SV.

In May 2019, Mahdavikia obtained UEFA A Licence and plans to enter DFB's Fußballlehrer course.

Famous matches
Mahdavikia's most prolific club match was Hamburger SV's match against Juventus in the Champions League. He was the impetus that rallied Hamburg back after being down 3–1 by scoring once, assisting one and winning a penalty for Hamburg that saw Hamburg take a 4–3 lead; Juve managed to equalise with an Inzaghi penalty.

Another famous game in the HSV shirt came in week 30 of the 2002–03 season. Mahdavikia scored one and assisted another two goals in Hamburg's 4–0 win over 1. FC Nuremberg. Kicker gave him a much rare perfect note of 1.0.

Mehdi's greatest national team match, arguably, was against South Korea in the 2004 Asia Cup where he assisted three goals in Iran's 4–3 win. Many also point to his dynamic game against the United States in World Cup 1998 that saw him score Iran's second and winning goal, as his best ever. Another excellent match where he scored two great goals was against China in the qualification round for the 1998 World Cup when he was just 20 years old.

Personal life

Mahdavikia played several sports as a youngster and was exceptionally talented at handball, even being named captain of Iran's under 14 team.

Mahdavikia is married to Sepideh and has a daughter, Asal.

In April 2006, Mahdavikia caused a stir when it came out he married a second wife named, Samira Samii, while being in his native Iran in December 2005, thus practising bigamy. He himself stated that he made a "big mistake", and they divorced after a short while.

Mahdavikia's younger brother, Hadi played for Homa F.C. and Persepolis F.C., and now is the head coach of KIA Football Academy. Mahdavikia's nephew Mostafa is also a football player in Iran.

Career statistics

Club

International

1.Excluding a friendly match against Ghana U-23 that is not considered a full international.

Scores and results list Iran's goal tally first, score column indicates score after each Mahdavikia goal.

Honours
Persepolis
Azadegan League: 1995–96, 1996–97, 1998–99

Hamburger SV
 DFB-Ligapokal: 2003
 UEFA Intertoto Cup: 2005

Iran
Asian Games: 1998
AFC Asian Cup third place: 1996, 2004
AFC–OFC Challenge Cup: 2003

Individual
AFC Goal of the Month: September 1997
AFC Youth Player of the Year: 1997
Bundesliga top assist provider: 2002–03
AFC Player of the Year: 2003
 Asian Cup All-Star Team: 2004
Hamburger SV All-time Team: 2012
AFC Asian Cup Fans' All-time Best XI: 2018
IFFHS Asian Men's Team of All Time: 2021

See also 
List of men's footballers with 100 or more international caps

References

External links

 
 RSSSF archive of Mehdi Mahdavikia's international appearances
 Profile at TeamMelli.com

Iranian footballers
Iran international footballers
Persepolis F.C. players
Association football wingers
VfL Bochum players
Hamburger SV players
Expatriate footballers in Germany
Bundesliga players
Persian Gulf Pro League players
Iranian expatriate footballers
Iranian expatriate sportspeople in Germany
FIFA Century Club
Eintracht Frankfurt players
Steel Azin F.C. players
Damash Gilan players
1996 AFC Asian Cup players
1998 FIFA World Cup players
2000 AFC Asian Cup players
2004 AFC Asian Cup players
2006 FIFA World Cup players
2007 AFC Asian Cup players
People from Tehran
1977 births
Living people
Asian Games gold medalists for Iran
Asian Footballer of the Year winners
Asian Young Footballer of the Year winners
Asian Games medalists in football
Footballers at the 1998 Asian Games
Medalists at the 1998 Asian Games
Hamburger SV II players
Hamburger SV non-playing staff
Iranian football managers